Jane Njeri Maina is a Kenyan politician who is currently a member of the Kenya National Assembly as Woman Representative for Kirinyaga County. She is a member of the United Democratic Alliance a Kenya Kwanza affiliate party.

Early life
Maina, an Advocate by profession, was born and raised in Kibingoti, Ndia Constituency in Kirinyaga County and attended primary school at Kiangoma Primary School. She then proceeded for her High School education at kabare Girls.

Maina studied law at the University of Nairobi and was admitted as an advocate of the High Court (Kenya).

Legal career

Maina is the Managing Partner of the Law Firm Njeri Maina Law Advocates and undertakes pro bono cases .

Political career
On April 15, 2022, Njeri Maina clinched the UDA Party ticket after beating former Kirinyaga County Speaker Anne Wangechi and private detective Jane Mugoh.

Maina was elected to the Kenya National Assembly as the Woman Representative for Kirinyaga County in the 2022 general election, representing the United Democratic Alliance at 28 years making her the youngest Member of parliament ever elected in Central Province (Kenya) . She garnered 175,001 votes while Rose Wachira garnered 49,892 votes.

Election results

References

Members of the National Assembly (Kenya)
United Democratic Alliance (Kenya) politicians
Kenyan women representatives
1994 births
Living people
WikiProject Kenya
Members of the 13th Parliament of Kenya
21st-century Kenyan women politicians
21st-century Kenyan politicians